is the name of two railway stations in Shinjuku, Tokyo, Japan, served by the Seibu Shinjuku Line (station number SS04) and the Toei Ōedo Line (station number E-32) respectively. The two stations are separated by approximately two minutes' walk through a shopping street.

Lines
Nakai Station is served by the following two lines.
Seibu Shinjuku Line
Toei Ōedo Line

Station layout

Seibu
The Seibu station has two side platforms serving two tracks. The station has a third central track used for passing express trains in both directions.

Toei
The Toei station has an island platform with two tracks, located underground at a depth of 35 m, parallel to and below both Yamate-dori and the Central Circular Route.

History 
The Seibu station opened on 16 April 1927. The Toei station opened in 1997.

Station numbering was introduced on all Seibu Railway lines during fiscal 2012, with Nakai Station becoming "SS04". The station number for the Ōedo Line is E-32.

The Seibu station was re-configured in 2016 to place the Seibu ticket gates underground, creating north and south exits from the station.

Passenger statistics
In fiscal 2013, the station was the 35th busiest on the Seibu network with an average of 28,264 passengers daily. In fiscal 2012, an average of 11,086 people used the Toei station to board a train per day.

The passenger figures for the Seibu station in previous years are as shown below.

See also
 List of railway stations in Japan

References

External links

Nakai Station information (Seibu Railway) 

Toei Ōedo Line
Seibu Shinjuku Line
Stations of Tokyo Metropolitan Bureau of Transportation
Stations of Seibu Railway
Railway stations in Tokyo
Railway stations in Japan opened in 1927